Bryan Ricardo Danesi Mora (born 6 May 1989) is a Chilean former footballer. His last club was San Antonio Unido.

Club career

O'Higgins
Danesi was promoted to adult team of O'Higgins in mid-2007. On 21 July, he scored his first professional goal against Everton de Viña del Mar in a 2–0 home win for Torneo Clausura's first matchday.

On 11 February 2008, during Torneo Apertura's fourth matchday, he scored his side's goal in a 1–2 away win over Cobreloa at Calama. He scored his second professional goal one month later in a 2–1 home win over Rangers de Talca on March 16. The next matchday he again scored his third goal in a 2–1 away defeat with Ñublense on 22 March.

San Luis de Quillota
In 2009, Danesi netted a goal for San Luis de Quillota during the Primera B de Chile promotion playoffs against Curicó Unido. Specifically, he scored in his side's 3–0 victory over Curicó Unido, which allowed Quillota–based side the promotion to 2010 Primera División de Chile.

Deportes Concepción
In 2013, he was signed by Deportes Concepción.

Deportes Linares
He scored his only one goal for Deportes Linares on 19 October 2014, in a 1–3 home defeat against Municipal Mejillones.

Cobreloa
On 29 June 2015, it was reported that Danesi would be the new playmaker of Cobreloa, signing which concreted in early June. He was officially presented on June 7 alongside Paulo Olivares, Enzo Guerrero, José Barrera, Manuel Simpertegui, Carlos Santibáñez, Boris Sandoval, Facundo Peraza from Uruguay and the four Argentinian players Nahuel Pansardi, Walter Gómez, Jorge De Olivera and Jorge Piris.

San Antonio Unido
On 10 September 2016, Danesi joined Segunda División de Chile (third-tier) side San Antonio Unido.

International career
Along with Chile U18 he won the 2008 João Havelange Tournament.

Honour

International
Chile U18
 João Havelange Tournament (1): 2008

References

External links
 Profile at BDFA 
 
 Danesi's Profile at Football-Lineups

1989 births
Living people
People from Quilpué
People from Marga Marga Province
People from Valparaíso Region
Chilean footballers
Chile youth international footballers
Primera B de Chile players
Chilean Primera División players
Segunda División Profesional de Chile players
O'Higgins F.C. footballers
San Luis de Quillota footballers
Deportes Temuco footballers
Deportes Concepción (Chile) footballers
Deportes Linares footballers
Cobreloa footballers
San Antonio Unido footballers
Association football defenders